The 2017 BOSS GP season was the 23rd season of the BOSS GP series. The championship began on 21 April at Hockenheim and finished on 1 October at Imola.

Teams and Drivers

Calendar

Championship standings
 Points for both championships were awarded as follows:

Drivers Standings

1 Andreas Fielder lost the points earned for winning the Formula Class in the first Hockenheim race for using incorrect tires. He was however still credited with the win.

References

External links
 

Boss GP
Boss GP